St Albans Charter Market is an outdoor street market in the cathedral city and market town of St Albans. The market runs from Market Place North-East up St Peter's Street to the junction with Catherine Street and is managed by St Albans City and District Council.

History

Religious establishment to secular control 

Wulsin, the sixth abbot of St Albans founded St Albans Market in circa 860 to generate income for the Abbey and to form the centre of a new town.

Market Place became largely built over, and the houses and courts and alleys between Chequer Street and the street now called Market Place were gradually formed. French Row, also known as Cobblers Row and Cordwainers Row, was in like manner erected, and was built before 1335 so that the encroachments on the Market Place must have begun at an early date.

As part of the dissolution of the monasteries, Henry VIII closed the Abbey in 1539 and took possession of the market, it remained crown property for the next fourteen years.

In 1553, Henry’s son Edward VI sold the right to hold the market on Wednesdays and Saturdays as well as three fairs on: Lady Day (25 March), St Alban's Day (22 June), and Michaelmas Day (29 September) to a group of local merchants and landowners. The letters patent which recorded this sale also incorporated St Albans as a borough.

The new mayor acted as clerk of the market overseeing the setting of prices, the accuracy of weights and measures, and presided over the Court of Pie Powder which enforced the rules of the market.

At an early date, the stalls were grouped by what they sold. Cheap or Cheping is an archaic terms for market and shambles is an archaic term for the area of a market where butchery occurred so the market was divided into: a 'Fleshambles', the Fish Shambles, the Malt Cheping, the Wheat Cheping, the Leather Shambles, the Pudding Shambles, the Wool Market, and Cordwainers or Coblers Row.

Market bell 

The market bell was cast in 1729 and was used until 1855. Non-freeman of the town were not allowed to trade under the bell was rung at 10 a.m. Formerly housed in the market house it is now the second bell of the Clock Tower.

Corn exchange 

The roof of the old market hall was supported on posts and there were no walls, it was open to the elements. Beneath it grain was sold retail to householders, and wholesale to millers, bakers, and corn factors. The repeal of the Corn Laws in 1846 freed up the market for corn trading, and led to a boom in the building of corn exchanges. St Albans corn exchange was built on the site of the market hall following an architectural competition in 1854 with demolition of the old market hall in 1856 and the new corn exchange opened within a year.

Demise and return of the Wednesday market 

In the early 18th century the Wednesday market lapsed and livestock and corn were sold on Saturday.

Despite St Albans being in the midst of corn and cattle country and having the advantage of access to three railways lines, the cattle trade suffered. If cattle were purchased on a Saturday they could not complete their journey on the Sabbath, so the buyer needed to pay for accommodation and feed till Monday.

In the spring of 1872 Town Councillor Edwards was active in promoting the change of the cattle and corn markets to Wednesdays. Councillors and farmers all agreed.

Sale of horses, carriages, carts, harness, implements was transferred to the St Albans Wednesday Cattle Market from Harpenden in 1890.

Modern Market 

The modern market is a general market with produce, clothing, homewares, and jewellery for sale. Saturday remains the busiest day. There is an increasing element of street food.

Other markets 

In addition to the Charter Market and fairs, there are a number of other markets regulated under the Part III of the Food Act 1984. On the second Sunday of each month a farmers’ style market with a heavier emphasis on produce. Two markets are run on behalf of St Albans City and District by the St Albans Business Improvement District, each Friday there is a Artisan Market in Market place and there is a vintage and antiques market on the third Sunday of each month.

Transport

Bus 

230, 300, 301, 302, 304, 305, 357, 361, 601 The Alban Way, 602, 653 Tigermoth, S4, S5,  and S6.

Railway 

The nearest stations are St Albans Abbey and St Albans City.

References

External links 

 Albans City and District Council's markets webpages
 St Albans's markets webpages

St Albans
9th-century establishments in England
Retail markets in England